Khemewadi is a village in Belgaum district in Karnataka, India. As of 2011, Khemewadi had a population of 358. 69.44% of the population was literate, male literacy stood at 74.53%, while female literacy stood at 64.42%. A total of 73 houses were counted in 2011.

References

Villages in Belagavi district